St George Australian Football Club Inc is an Australian Football club competing in the AFL Sydney competition and based in the area of St George, New South Wales. At one stage affiliated with the Adelaide Crows football club, they reverted to their traditional red and white colours in 2009. They are known as the Dragons.

History 

The club formed in 1929. Their home ground is Olds Park, Penshurst. St George have been successful in recent seasons, including grand final appearances in 2004 and 2007 but the club is still aiming for their first premiership since 1993 after defeat in both those grand finals.

Based on market feedback and old colleagues/members requests, the Club Executive confirmed the Club in season 2009, would return to its original colours, Red & White, identified as the St George Dragons. The Club changed its name in 2001, to St George Crows, to align itself with Adelaide Crows AFL Club. This decision ultimately became a disaster and split the Club whereby, support from old players and supporters dropped off dramatically. The change back to St George Dragons, has allowed it to identify with the long established name, Dragons, identified with St George area, rugby league team, residents and businesses.

Premierships

First Grade

Reserve Grade

Colts (under 18s/19s)

Third Grade

Women's

Masters (over 35s)

Club song 
The club's song is sung to the tune of The Yankee Doodle Boy.

"Oh we're the St George team, the Dragons

A team of always do or die

Our victory we will always be assured

When for the ball the Dragons fly

And when the final bell is over

That's the time we celebrate

Oh, Dragons always stick together

We're a happy club forever

We are the good old red and white."

Famous players
The club produced Nick Davis for the Sydney Swans in the Australian Football League.

Mark Roberts who played with Sydney, Brisbane Bears and won a premiership with North Melbourne was also from St George. Both Mark Roberts and Nick Davis played their junior football with Ramsgate JAFC.

Dylan Addison played with the GWS Giants in the 2016 and 2017 seasons, having previously played for Western Bulldogs over eight seasons. Addison's junior club was Bankstown.

More recently ex-St George players Lloyd Perris, Nick Shipley , & Jake Brown has been drafted by AFL clubs in the AFL draft.

External links

 
 AFL Sydney Fixtures and Results

Australian rules football clubs in Sydney
Australian rules football clubs established in 1929
1929 establishments in Australia
AFC